General Lázaro Cárdenas del Río National Airport or simply Lázaro Cárdenas Airport  is an airport located  at Lázaro Cárdenas, Michoacán, Mexico. It handles national air traffic for the city of Lázaro Cárdenas.

It handled 5,447 passengers in 2020, and 1,945 passengers in 2021.

References

External links

 MMLC at Fallingrain.
 MMLC at Elite Jets.
 MMLC photo at Our Airports.

Airports in Michoacán